Beirut Souks is a major commercial district in Beirut Central District. With over 200 shops, 25 restaurants and cafes, an entertainment center, a 14 cinema complex, periodic street markets and an upcoming department store, it is Beirut's largest and most diverse shopping and leisure area. Beirut Souks also features piazzas and public space. Designed in five separate commissions by international and Lebanese architects, Beirut Souks offer 128,000 sq. m of built-up area interspersed with landscaped pedestrian zones.

The souks have historically been at the commercial heart of Beirut. They sustained severe damage during the Lebanese Civil War and were rebuilt by Solidere according to the ancient Greek street grid, maintaining the historic landmarks and pre-war street names.

History

Souk al-Tawileh and Souk al-Jamil were a favorite shopping destination before the civil war and were frequented by Lebanese and Europeans alike since they housed fashionable boutiques and haute-couture houses,
while Souk al-Franj functioned as Lebanon's biggest fruit, vegetable and flower market.

Destruction
During the Lebanese Civil War, Beirut was the scene of fierce battles between warring factions; after a few months of fighting, the brief ceasefire in September 1975 allowed the business owners of Beirut's central district to evacuate their shops' assets before fighting resumed turning downtown Beirut, including its souks into a sniper  patrolled no man's land. In October 1975, fighting extended to the souks, gunmen blew up shops and set others on fire. The destruction of the souks affected Christian and Muslim merchants alike. The battle of the souks lasted for 2 and half months until December 1975 before extending to the residential area of Ras Beirut
During the spring of 1983,  the Antoun Bey Khan, a historic caravanserai and a landmark of the souks was demolished  to clear the view towards the sea.

Reconstruction

Reconstruction of Beirut's central district began as soon as the guns fell silent in 1990. Dar Al-Handasah was commissioned by the Lebanese Council for Development and Reconstruction to prepare a master plan for the rebuilding of the dilapidated central district. Henri Eddeh,  a senior architect planner at Dar al-Handasah proposed a complete demolition of the historical city center which was to be replaced by modern buildings and infrastructure.

The notion of bulldozing the entire cityscape stirred a heated polemic within the intellectual circles and widespread opposition to the master plan led to the adoption of an alternate strategy aiming at preserving and renovating what could be salvaged of Beirut's historic buildings. The new master plan drawn by Lebanese architect Jad Tabet was approved by the Lebanese parliament and its implementation started in September 1994; a private share-holding company (Solidere) was created by the Lebanese government to manage the entire process of reconstruction and rehabilitation of Beirut's central district. Except for specific landmarks that were later salvaged and restored, a large part of the souks' medieval buildings were too damaged to be saved. The void left by the destruction of the Souks left a gap in Beirut's identity, Solidere sought to bring back the souks historic commercial function at the heart of Beirut and appeal to the mercantile community that had fled to the periphery during the 16 year civil war. Solidere launched an international design competition to rebuild the souks while in keeping with the original Hellenistic street grid that characterized the old souks and the area's historical landmarks. The contest was won by José Rafael Moneo Vallés who designed the southern souk and British architect Kevin Dash who designed the Gold souks. The construction of the souks were entrusted to Lebanese firm Hourie. The master plan for the Beirut Souks was approved by ministerial decrees  which preceded the launch of the reconstruction project. Costs of reconstruction were estimated at 100 million dollars and work duration between 18 months and 2 years. The souks was set to open in 2000 but inauguration was postponed due to licensing delays related to political issues; meanwhile the construction of the underground parking was underway. In 2004 Solidere received the license and work on the souks began to be withheld in the aftermath of summer of 2006 war and the subsequent political instability.

Opening
Beirut Souks were opened to the public on October 2, 2009, after a 10-year delay due to political instability. The Gold Souk's opening was also delayed due to financial disagreements between the syndicate of Expert Goldsmiths and Jewelers in Lebanon and Solidere.  Visitors on the opening day wandered through the few opened shops while construction works were still underway.

Location
Beirut Souks are located in Beirut Central District, they are delimited by Mir Majid Arslan Avenue to the North, Rue Weygand street to the south, Patriarch Howayek to the west and  Allenby street to the east.

Architecture and description

The new Souks are a low rise complex of two components: the South Souks and the North Souks. The Souks were designed in five different commissions by international and Lebanese architects.

South souks
The South Souks were designed by Rafael Moneo in collaboration with Samir Khairallah while the Gold Souk was designed by Kevin Dash and his Lebanese counterpart Rafic Khoury. The Souks were designed as interconnected open spaces with many access points; there are 200 shops located along long vaulted shopping alleys and arcades with 49 of these shops located in the Gold Souk. The new Souks have retained their Hellenistic street grid layout as well as their historical names; these are: Souk al Tawila (the long souk), Souk Arwam, Souk Jamil, Souk Ayyass, Souk Sayyour, Souk Bustros and Souk Arwad.

Conservation
Solidere's plan  preserved the heritage left by the different civilizations marking the Beirut Souks' historic location from the Phoenician era until the French mandate. The archaeological findings recovered in the Souks, which have been restored, include the ancient Phoenician commercial quarter, the Medieval moat, the Mameluk Koranic madrassa of Ibn Iraq Al Dimashqi and the Byzantine mosaics excavated on site.

Shops
Beirut Souks has over 200 shops, including:

 Accessorize
 Adidas
 Antoine
 Aldo
 Anne Klein
 Armani
 Aïzone
 Bershka
 Body Shop
 Bottega Veneta
 Burberry
 Calvin Klein
 Camper
 Carolina Herrera
 Chloé
 Christian Louboutin
 Claire's
 Cole Haan
 Converse
 Cortefiel
 Damiani
 D&G
 Furla
 Geox
 Häagen-Dazs
 H&M
 Hermès
 La cave de Joël Robuchon
 Louis Vuitton
 M.A.C
 Mango
 Mango accessories
 Mexx
 Massimo Dutti
 Nike
 Nine West
 L'Occitane en Provence
 Patchi
 Porsche Design
 Promod
 Pull and Bear
 Puma
 Quiksilver
 Reebok
 Rodeo Drive
 Roxy
 Samsung
 Sony World
 Stella McCartney
 Stradivarius
 Sunglass Hut
 Timberland
 Tommy Hilfiger
 Toy Watch
 Uterqüe
 Vera Wang
 Vero Moda
 Virgin
 Yves Saint Laurent
 Zara

Awards
The Beirut Souks received in 2009 the Capital Issues Award under the category of Architectural excellence. The award was collected on behalf of Solidere by Angus Gavin on December 22, 2009.

Incidents
On 15 September 2020, a fire broke out in a Zaha Hadid building at Beirut Souks, close to the city's port, but was quickly extinguished.

See also
Avenue des Français
Bazaar
Bazaari 
Rue Maarad
Souq

References

External links
 Beirut Souks Website
 Solidere Website
 Beirut Souks Photo Albums
 Beirut souks video
 Stella McCartney store at Beirut Souks

Retailing in Lebanon
Shopping districts and streets in Lebanon
Tourist attractions in Beirut
Pedestrian malls
Souqs